Emarhendia is a monotypic genus of flowering plants belonging to the family Gesneriaceae. It only contains one species,Emarhendia bettiana (M.R.Hend.) Kiew, A.Weber & B.L.Burtt.

Its native range is Peninsula Malaysia.

The genus name of Emarhendia is in honour of M. R. Henderson (1899–1982), a Scottish botanist, and it was published and described in Beitr. Biol. Pflanzen Vol.70 on page 398 in (1997-1998, publ. 1998). The species has one known synonym, Paraboea bettiana .

References

Didymocarpoideae
Gesneriaceae genera
Plants described in 1998
Flora of Malaya